The 1934 Murray State Thoroughbreds football team was an American football team that represented Murray State Teachers College—now known as Murray State University—as a member of the Southern Intercollegiate Athletic Association (SIAA) during the 1934 college football season. Led by third-year head coach Roy Stewart, the Thoroughbreds compiled an overall record of 6–3 with a mark of 5–2 in conference play, placing tenth in the SIAA.

Schedule

References

Murray State
Murray State Racers football seasons
Murray State Thoroughbreds football